State Route 92 (SR-92), also known in various portions as the Timpanogos Highway, and Alpine Loop Scenic Highway is a scenic state highway in Utah County, Utah that runs from I-15/US-89 in Lehi to US-189 in Provo Canyon.

Route description
The route begins at Ashton Boulevard in northwest Lehi. From its western terminus it heads east through Highland, and up American Fork Canyon, where it enters the Uinta National Forest. Shortly after entering the canyon, it passes the Timpanogos Cave National Monument, a famous group of caves buried in the side of the canyon. The route continues up the canyon, but, just before leaving the canyon, it has it junction with the southern end of Utah State Route 144, which heads further north up American Fork Canyon to Tibble Fork Reservoir. SR-92 then bends to the south (with a short bend that extends briefly into Wasatch County) to connect with the west end of the Cascade Scenic Byway (Forest Road 114). After passing the east side of Mount Timpanogos and then the Sundance Resort, the road links up with US-189 in Provo Canyon at Wildwood, just west of the Utah-Wasatch county line and east of the Provo Canyon Tunnels.

The portion of SR-92 west of the intersection with Canyon Road (former SR-146) is included in the National Highway System.

History

The state legislature created State Route 80 in 1935, connecting SR-1 (US-91, now I-15/US-89) near Point of the Mountain with SR-74 south of Alpine. An extension in 1941 took SR-80 east to the Uinta National Forest boundary in American Fork Canyon, replacing a short piece of SR-146 (created in 1933) from SR-74 to the mouth of the canyon. At the other end of the highway, State Route 168 was built in 1933 as a forest road and numbered in 1935, connecting SR-7 (US-189) with Aspen Grove. SR-80 was extended through the forest to SR-7, absorbing SR-168, in 1953. Because the number 80 was needed for I-80, SR-80 was renumbered SR-92 in the 1977 renumbering.

Commuter lanes
The Timpanogos Highway Commuter Lanes, built from May 2009 to October 2011, are a  grade-separated parallel road of Timpanogos Highway in Lehi with one lane in each direction to bypass signal-controlled intersections. The west ramp of the commuter lane is next to the Interstate 15 intersection near North Frontage Road, the east ramp is between Highland Boulevard and North Tamarack Drive. The estimated costs were $170 million.

Major intersections

References

External links

092
 092
092
Lehi, Utah
 092